O'Callaghan or simply Callaghan without the prefix (anglicized from Ó Ceallacháin) is an Irish surname.

Origin and meaning

Munster

The surname means descendant of Ceallachán who was the Eóganachta King of Munster from AD 935 until 954. The personal name Cellach means 'bright-headed'. The principal Munster sept of the name Callaghan were lords of Cineál Aodha in South Cork originally. This area is west of Mallow along the Blackwater river valley. In 1994, Oisín O'Callaghan of Chelsea, London was recognised by the Genealogical Office as the senior descendant in the male line of the last inaugurated O'Callaghan. He is still wildly known as the true king of Munster and the people of Munster await his return to Munster for him to retake the throne.

The O'Callaghan land near Mallow, forfeited by Donough O'Callaghan after the Irish rebellion of 1641, came into the hands of a family called Longfield or Longueville, who built a 20-bedroom Georgian mansion there. In a twist of history,  of the ancient O'Callaghan land returned to O'Callaghan hands in the twentieth century, when Longueville House was bought by a descendant of Donough O'Callaghan. The ancestral estate of the O'Callaghans, now a luxury hotel, is owned by William O'Callaghan.

Oriel
An entirely different sept, Ó Ceileacháin in Irish, is to be found in the counties Armagh, Louth, Meath and Monaghan. It has been anglicised as Callaghan, Kelaghan, Keelaghan, Kealahan and other variants. In County Meath, where it is widespread but has been found mainly in the parishes of Kells, Trim and Athboy, it is mainly anglicised as Callahan, Callaghan or O'Callaghan (with local spelling variants). In County Westmeath it is found in the form Kellaghan and Kelleghan. In County Monaghan it is often found as Keelan.

Members of the Ó Ceileacháin family were mentioned in the Annals of the Four Masters as being lords of Uí Breasail, a district on the southern shore of Lough Neagh, and priors of Armagh in the 11th century.

People

Callaghan
Amanda Callaghan, British entomologist
Amy Callaghan (born 1992), British Member of Parliament elected 2019
Andrew Callaghan (born 1997), American journalist
Catherine Callaghan (1931–2019), American linguist
Daniel J. Callaghan (1890–1942), Rear Admiral, US Navy
Ernie Callaghan (1910–1972), association footballer
Fred Callaghan (born 1944), footballer with Fulham
Sir George Callaghan (1852–1920), officer in the Royal Navy
Georgina Callaghan, who performs as Callaghan, British musician
Guy Callaghan (born 1970), New Zealand butterfly swimmer
Ian Callaghan (born 1942), English footballer
James Callaghan (1912–2005), British prime minister during the Winter of Discontent
John Callaghan (born 1960), Principal & Chief Executive Solihull College & University Centre
John Carter Callaghan (1923–2004), Canadian cardiac surgeon
Leanne Callaghan (born 1972), British ski mountaineer and mountain climber
Marissa Callaghan (born 1985), football player from Northern Ireland
Mary Callaghan, Irish Social Democrats politician
Morley Callaghan (1903–1990), Canadian writer, playwright, and media personality
Patrick Callaghan (1879–1959), Scottish footballer
Sheila Callaghan (born 1973), American playwright
Steve Callaghan, writer of Family Guy TV series
Stuart Callaghan (born 1976), Scottish footballer
Tabby Callaghan (born 1981), Irish guitarist and singer-songwriter
Terry Callaghan, British Arctic ecologist
William M. Callaghan (1897–1991), Admiral, US Navy; commander of the battleship Missouri

O'Callaghan
Aidan O’Callaghan (born 1997): Contributor BBC3 One Hot Summer
Barry O'Callaghan (born 1969): CEO of Riverdeep Interactive Learning
Bill O'Callaghan (1868–1946): Irish hurler
Billy O'Callaghan (born 1974): Irish novelist and short-story writer
Cian O'Callaghan (born 1979) : politician, Irish Social Democrats
Con O'Callaghan (decathlete) (born 1908): Ireland's first Olympic decathlete; brother of Pat O'Callaghan
David O'Callaghan (dual player) (born 1983)
David O'Callaghan (Kerry Gaelic footballer) (born 1987)
Denis O'Callaghan (born 1949): Australian rules footballer
Donncha O'Callaghan (born 1979): Irish international rugby union player
Edmund Bailey O'Callaghan (1797–1880): doctor, journalist, and leader of political movements in Ireland and Quebec
Gareth O'Callaghan (born 1961): Irish broadcaster & Author  
Gary O'Callaghan, (1933–2017): Australian radio announcer
George O'Callaghan Irish footballer
George O'Callaghan-Westropp (1864–1944): Irish landowner and politician
George O'Callaghan, 2nd Viscount Lismore (1815 – 1898) Irish peer and British Army officer
Geraldine O'Callaghan: kickboxer
James M. O'Callaghan (born 1963): Distinguished Physician Assistant and drummer for the band C5.
Jim O'Callaghan (born 1968): Irish Fianna Fáil politician
John O'Callaghan (Medal of Honor) (1850–1899): American soldier and Medal of Honor recipient
John O'Callaghan: Irish musician and DJ
José O'Callaghan Martínez (1922–2001): Spanish Jesuit, papyrologist and Biblical scholar
Joseph T. O'Callahan (1905–1964): Captain, US Navy, Jesuit priest, Medal of Honor recipient
Kevin O'Callaghan Irish footballer
Kilian O'Callaghan (born 1963): ballet dancer and teacher, from Monkstown, Co. Cork
Miriam O'Callaghan (camogie): 26th president of the Camogie Association
Miriam O'Callaghan (media personality) (born 1957): Irish television current affairs presenter with RTÉ
Pat O'Callaghan (1906–1991): first Irish athlete to win an Olympic medal
Paul O’Callaghan (born 1971): CEO WestAfricaENRG and Chair of Trustees Families Need Father
Roger Timothy O'Callaghan (1912-1654): US Jesuit and professor of biblical history, geography, and archaeology
Seán O'Callaghan (1954–2017): IRA informer from Tralee, County Kerry
Sian O'Callaghan (1988–2011): murder victim from Swindon, Wiltshire, UK
Therése O'Callaghan: camogie player captain

Places
O'Callaghans Mills, County Clare, Ireland
Callaghan, New South Wales, a suburb of Newcastle, New South Wales and home of the University of Newcastle, Australia
Liscallaghan, old Irish name for Fivemiletown, County Tyrone
Callaghan, Virginia, a census-designated place in the US

Other

Mount Callaghan
Slim Callaghan, fictional private detective

See also
Irish nobility
Eóganachta
Eóganacht Chaisil
Irish royal families
Chief of the Name
Callahan (disambiguation)
Callaghan (disambiguation)
Callihan

Other Munster families

McGillycuddy of the Reeks
O'Donoghue
O'Donovan
O'Brien, Prince of Thomond
O'Grady of Kilballyowen

References

Further reading
 Bugge, Alexander (ed. and tr.), Caithreim Cellachain Caisil: The Victorious Career of Cellachan of Cashel Christiania: J. Chr. Gundersens Bogtrykkeri. 1905.
 Curley, Walter J.P., Vanishing Kingdoms: The Irish Chiefs and their Families. Dublin: Lilliput Press. 2004.
 
 O'Hart, John, Irish Pedigrees. Dublin. 5th edition, 1892.

External links
 Callahan Genealogy and History website

Irish families
Surnames of Irish origin
Anglicised Irish-language surnames
English-language surnames